Emiliano Rodríguez (born 10 June 1937) is a Spanish retired professional basketball player. He was named one of FIBA's 50 Greatest Players in 1991. He was enshrined into the FIBA Hall of Fame in 2007, and in 2008, Rodríguez was chosen as one of the 50 Greatest EuroLeague Contributors.

Club career
At the club level, Rodríguez played for Aismalíbar (1958–1960), and Real Madrid (1960–1973). With Real, he won four FIBA European Champions' Cups (now called EuroLeague) (1964, 1965, 1967, and 1968), 12 Spanish League titles (1961–1966, 1968–1973) and nine Spanish Cup titles (1961, 1962, 1965–1967, 1970–1973). He was the top scorer of the Spanish League in 1963 and 1964.

National team career
Rodríguez played in 175 games with the senior Spain national basketball team, participating in the 1960 Summer Olympics, the 1968 Summer Olympic Games, and seven EuroBaskets, in the years 1959, 1961, 1963 (named the tournament's MVP), 1965, 1967, 1969, and 1971.

References

External links
 FIBA Hall of Fame Profile
 FIBAEurope.com Profile
 LeyendasBaloncestoRealMadrid.es Profile 
 Euroleague.net Profile

1937 births
Living people
FIBA Hall of Fame inductees
People from Tierras de León
Sportspeople from the Province of León
Real Madrid Baloncesto players
Small forwards
Spanish men's basketball players
Olympic basketball players of Spain
Basketball players at the 1960 Summer Olympics
Basketball players at the 1968 Summer Olympics
Mediterranean Games silver medalists for Spain
Mediterranean Games medalists in basketball
Competitors at the 1959 Mediterranean Games
Competitors at the 1963 Mediterranean Games